CreatiVoices Productions, commonly known as CreatiVoices, is a Philippine-based voice-over company that provides professional voice artists for various clients like ABS-CBN/HeroTV, GMA, The Philippine Star, SM SuperMalls, and many others. It was established on October 25, 2005, by Pocholo Gonzales, the CEO/managing director, producer, and at the same time, one of the voice artists of the company.

Operations 
CreatiVoices Productions creates different types of audio requirement such as corporate videos, narration, commercials, audio books, websites, multi-media, messages on hold, looping or dubbing, animation, instructional videos and broadcast quality podcasts. 
 
Among its voice-over services are multimedia presentations, E-learning modules, dubbing and voice-overs for animation, telenovelas, industrial films and documentaries, audio books, GPS navigation systems, museum audio guides, customized Interactive Voice Response (IVR) systems, voice mail messages, animated series for kids, computer games which include music and sound effects, on-line demos, in-house training and presentations, radio and TV advertising, and many more.
 
The production team is composed of technical staff, writers, directors, crew and producers.

Clients 
CreatiVoices had rendered services to various clienteles such as ABS-CBN/HEROTV, GMA-7,  Smart Telecommunications, Globe Telecoms, Inquirer.Net, DDB Philippines, Holycow Animation, Cutting Edge Studios, Voice of the Youth Network, Universal Motors Corporation, Nestle Philippines, Unilever Philippines, Radio Mindanao Network, Procter and Gamble Asia, LRT – Light Rail Transit Authority, Department of Education, Pru Life UK, Equitable PCI Bank, Sun Cellular, Bank of the Philippine Islands, Metrobank, BDO Philippines, The Philippine Star, PLDT, SM Supermalls, Yahoo SouthEast Asia, Diwa Publishing, BigTop Media Productions, et cetera.

Company Membership 

CreatiVoices Productions is a corporate member of the Philippine Marketing Association (PMA), board member of the Advertising Suppliers Association of the Philippines (ASAP), Animation Council of the Philippines (ACPI), Business Processing Association of the Philippines (BPAP). The company's talents and officers are also accredited with the Kapisanan ng mga Brodkaster ng Pilipinas (KBP).

Timeline 
Pocholo “The Voicemaster” Gonzales believed that voice acting is an art that needs to be heard, to be recognized and to be further developed. This led to the establishment of his own voice talent agency. In October 2005, Gonzales put up Creativoices Productions: The Voice of Creativity. In just a year, CreatiVoices already made a name in the industry.

In 2006, CreatiVoices rendered services to LadyLuck Digital. It produced voice-overs and audios for the first Filipino 3D game published abroad. It worked with Mike Enriquez, Vicky Morales, and Brian Ligsay, a director, producer, writer, and voice performer.

The company was also involved in a number of projects in 2007. It produced acting and dubbing workshops to develop more voice artists in the Philippines. On May, it launched Voiceworx, an acting and dubbing workshop that was held in September of the same year. In addition, CreatiVoices sponsored the Toy Convention. The event featured anime works, enthusiasts, hobbies and collectibles for everyone.

In August 2007, CreatiVoices worked with ARIVA Events Management for the first HR Philippines Convention 2007. The event featured HR managers and personnel who shared the newest trend and development in finding the right people for a dream job.

On the same month, CreatiVoices sponsored the GO-NEGOSYO series of events. The company was also featured in the FUDGE Magazine August Edition (Bamboo Cover) where Pocholo Gonzales and Brian Ligsay talked about dubbing and voice performance, trends and developments.

In September 2007, CreatiVoices Productions and Voice of the Youth (VOTY) Network  introduced the VOTY Radio Version 6.0, the sixth season of the successful youth oriented program, Voice of the Youth. The program aired over DZME 1530 kHz - Radio Uno! every Sunday, 10-11 A.M.

Voiceworx voice acting workshop started on September 8, 2007. The said workshop was designed to make the newbies and enthusiasts learn the craft and later on, jumpstart their career in voice acting and dubbing. Likewise, Creativoices Productions, together with big corporations Bayad Center, San Miguel Beer, Inquirer.net, sponsored the most awaited event in the Philippine Marketing Association, with its theme - "Bringing back the 70's." It also hosted the monthly Philippine Marketing Association-General Membership Meeting (PMA-GMM). CreatiVoices Productions celebrated its 2nd anniversary on October 25, 2007. An event entitled OkDubbers Fest was held on October 30, 2007, at Access Point, Sct. Borromeo St., near ABS CBN. Once again, CreatiVoices together with ARIVA Events hosted PMA-GMM and board election.

The company got involved with Animahenasyon 2007, the first Philippine animation festival in November 2007. The event was held at the Robinsons Movieworld, Robinsons Galleria from 
November 21–27, 2007. This week-long event featured original Filipino animation content.
 
In December 2007, HERO TV, the premiere all-Filipino anime cable channel (Ch 44 over Skycable/Homecable), celebrated its 3rd year of success with bands, singers, games, cosplay, and dubbing competition for anime enthusiasts and fans. Hataw, Hanep, Hero 3 (H3) was held on December 1–2 at the SMX, SM Mall of Asia, Pasay. CreatiVoices sponsored the event by spearheading the 2nd National Dubbing Competition.

Voiceworx 3 was held on January 5, 2008. Voiceworx has been successful in producing candidates for new voice-over projects and preparing talents on how to handle voice-over work and present themselves to producers and directors. Creativoices was also featured on ANC's Shoptalk  and on Sikap Pinoy DZMM TeleRadyo.
 
In March 2008, the company began promoting its 4th voice acting workshop. This time, it was a more comprehensive 8-week long seminar which focused more on voice acting and dubbing for telenovelas and anime. The workshop started on April 12, 2008. Due to the successful series of Voiceworx workshop, voice acting seminars became a trend and grew to be the targeted program of commercial, corporate, and live voice over jobs.
 
In July 2008, The VoiceMaster talked about the art of voice acting and Creativoices on Go Negosyo Big Time. It was aired over QTV Channel 11 on July 12, 2008. Likewise, during this month, Creativoices was featured on Matanglawin in ABS-CBN   and on Spotlight in RPN 9.
 
The company continued to produce talented voice over artists.  Jill Fernandez, a talent of CreatiVoices, was featured on Up Close and Personal with Marissa Del Mar in October 2008. On the other hand, in November 2008, the VoiceMaster himself was featured on MMDA On the Road.

References 

Talent agencies
Companies based in Makati
Philippine companies established in 2005